Scott Emerson may refer to:

 Scott Emerson (politician) (born 1964), Australian consultant, radio host, and politician
 Scott Emerson (baseball) (born 1971), American baseball player

See also
 Scott Emmerson